Chris Egan (born 26 October 1986) is a former professional Australian rules footballer who played for the Collingwood Football Club in the Australian Football League (AFL).

Egan was picked up by Collingwood with their first round draft pick, tenth overall, in the 2004 AFL Draft. He had represented Victoria Country in the 2004 AFL National Under 18 Championships.

Egan made his debut for Collingwood against Richmond in round 8 of the 2005 AFL season, and only missed two games for the remainder of the year.

He played a total of 24 games for 21 goals in 2005 and 2006, but only played three games in the following two seasons before being delisted in September 2008.

He is the nephew of Phil Egan, who played for Richmond and Melbourne, and also Les Bamblett who played for Footscray and Melbourne.

In early 2010, Egan signed with the Echuca Football Club which plays in the Goulburn Valley Football League.

References

External links
Chris Egan at the Collingwood Football Club website

1986 births
Collingwood Football Club players
Living people
Indigenous Australian players of Australian rules football
Australian rules footballers from Victoria (Australia)
Murray Bushrangers players
Echuca Football Club players